Sunshine Harbor is a 1922 American silent drama film directed by Edward L. Hemmer and starring Margaret Beecher, Howard Hall and Coit Albertson.

Cast
 Margaret Beecher as Betty Hopkins
 Howard Hall as Dr. Hopkins
 Coit Albertson as Hamilton Graves
 Ralf Harolde as Billy Saunders
 Julian Greer as Editor MacSorley
 Daniel Jarrett as Dugan

References

Bibliography
 Munden, Kenneth White. The American Film Institute Catalog of Motion Pictures Produced in the United States, Part 1. University of California Press, 1997.

External links

1922 films
1922 drama films
American black-and-white films
Silent American drama films
American silent feature films
1920s English-language films
Associated Exhibitors films
1920s American films
English-language drama films